ARA Veinticinco de Mayo or Veinticinco de Mayo may refer to one the following vessels of the Argentine Navy:

 , a brigantine launched in 1810, which served during the Independence War in the first Argentine naval squadron, and in the Civil War that followed
 , a schooner which served as a corsair during the Independence War 
 , a frigate which served during the Cisplatine War 
 , a frigate lost in a shipwreck in 1828 
 , a frigate in service from 1841 to 1860 
 , a steam-powered ship which was captured by Paraguay in 1865 causing the Argentine intervention in the Paraguayan War 
 , a cruiser in service from 1891 to 1916
 , a cruiser in service from 1931 to 1960
 , an aircraft carrier in service from 1969 to 1997

The English translation of the name is Twenty-fifth of May, which is the date of Argentina's May Revolution in 1810.

Set index articles on ships
Argentine Navy ship names